Carlill v Carbolic Smoke Ball Company [1892] EWCA Civ 1 is an English contract law decision by the Court of Appeal, which held an advertisement containing certain terms to get a reward constituted a binding unilateral offer that could be accepted by anyone who performed its terms. It is notable for its treatment of contract and of puffery in advertising, for its curious subject matter associated with medical quackery, and how the influential judges (particularly Lindley and Bowen) developed the law in inventive ways. Carlill is frequently discussed as an introductory contract case, and may often be the first legal case a law student studies in the law of contract.

The case concerned a flu remedy called the "carbolic smoke ball". The manufacturer advertised that buyers who found it did not work would be awarded £100, a considerable amount of money at the time. The company was found to have been bound by its advertisement, which was construed as an offer which the buyer, by using the smoke ball, accepted, creating a contract. The Court of Appeal held the essential elements of a contract were all present, including offer and acceptance, consideration and an intention to create legal relations, and rejected a number of defenses, including puffery.

Facts 
The Carbolic Smoke Ball Co. made a product called the "smoke ball" and claimed it to be a cure for influenza and a number of other diseases. (The 1889–1890 pandemic ongoing at the time was estimated to have killed 1 million people.) The smoke ball was a rubber ball with a tube attached. It was filled with carbolic acid (or phenol). The tube would be inserted into a user's nose and the ball would be squeezed at the bottom to release the vapours.

The Company published advertisements in the Pall Mall Gazette and other newspapers on November 13, 1891, claiming that it would pay £100 to anyone who got sick with influenza after using its product according to the instructions provided with it:

Louisa Elizabeth Carlill saw the advertisement, bought one of the balls and used it three times daily for nearly two months until she contracted the flu on 17 January 1892. She claimed £100 from the Carbolic Smoke Ball Company. They ignored two letters from her husband, a solicitor. On a third request for her reward, they replied with an anonymous letter that if it is used properly the company had complete confidence in the smoke ball's efficacy, but "to protect themselves against all fraudulent claims", they would need her to come to their office to use the ball each day and be checked by the secretary.  Carlill brought a claim to court. Counsel representing her argued that the advertisement and her reliance on it was a contract between the company and her, so the company ought to pay. The company argued it was not a serious contract.

Judgment

The Carbolic Smoke Ball Company, represented by H. H. Asquith, lost its argument at the Queen's Bench. It appealed straight away. The Court of Appeal unanimously rejected the company's arguments and held that there was a fully binding contract for £100 with Carlill. Among the reasons given by the three judges were (1) that the advertisement was not a unilateral invitation to treat to all the world but an offer restricted to those who acted upon the terms contained in the advertisement (2) that satisfying conditions for using the smoke ball constituted acceptance of the offer (3) that purchasing or merely using the smoke ball constituted good consideration, because it was a distinct detriment incurred at the behest of the company and, furthermore, more people buying smoke balls by relying on the advertisement was a clear benefit to Carbolic (4) that the company's claim that £1000 was deposited at the Alliance Bank showed the serious intention to be legally bound. The judgments of the court were as follows.

Lord Justice Lindley
Lindley gave the first judgment on it, after running through the facts again. He makes short shrift of the insurance and wagering contract arguments that were dealt with in the Queen's Bench.

He follows on with essentially five points. First, the advertisement was not "mere puff" as had been alleged by the company, because the deposit of £1000 in the bank evidenced seriousness. Second, the advertisement was an offer made specifically to anyone who performed the conditions in the advertisement rather than a statement "not made with anybody in particular." Third, communication of acceptance is not necessary for a contract when people's conduct manifests an intention to contract. Fourth, that the vagueness of the advertisement's terms was no insurmountable obstacle. And fifth, the nature of Carlill's consideration (what she gave in return for the offer) was good, because there is both an advantage in additional sales in reaction to the advertisement and a "distinct inconvenience" that people go to when using a smoke ball.

Lord Justice Bowen
Bowen's opinion was more tightly structured in style and is frequently cited. Five main steps in his reasoning can be identified. First, he says that the contract was not too vague to be enforced, because it could be interpreted according to what ordinary people would understand by it. He differed slightly from Lindley on what time period one could contract flu and still have a claim (Lindley said a "reasonable time" after use, while Bowen said "while the smoke ball is used"), but this was not a crucial point, because the fact was that Carlill got flu while using the smoke ball. Second, like Lindley, Bowen says that the advert was not mere puff because £1000 was deposited in the bank to pay rewards. Third, he said that although an offer was made to the whole world, the contract was not with the whole world. Therefore, it was not an absurd basis for a contract, because only the people who used it would bind the company. Fourth, he says that communication is not necessary to accept the terms of an offer; conduct is and should be sufficient. Fifth, good consideration was clearly given by Carlill because she went to the "inconvenience" of using it, and the company got the benefit of extra sales.

Lord Justice Smith
A L Smith's judgment was more general and concurred with both Lindley and Bowen's decisions.

Significance
Carlill is significant for two areas of law: the law of contract, and the doctrine of puffery. Both areas have impacted advertising, and the problem of medical quackery.

Law of contract

Carlill is frequently cited as a leading case in the common law of contract, particularly where unilateral contracts are concerned.

It provides an excellent study of the basic principles of contract and how they relate to everyday life. The case remains good law. It still binds the lower courts of England and Wales and is cited by judges with approval. However, in addition to the contractual remedy afforded to users, the same facts would give rise to a number of additional statutory remedies and punishments were an individual to place an advert in the same terms today.

Firstly, misleading advertising is a criminal offence. Under the Consumer Protection from Unfair Trading Regulations (secondary legislation, passed under the European Communities Act 1972), regulation 5 states that a commercial practice is misleading...

"if it contains false information and is therefore untruthful... or if it or its overall presentation in any way deceives or is likely to deceive the average consumer... even if the information is factually correct"

…in relation to a long list of actions and omissions by sellers. Misleading practices are unfair (r 3) and unfair practices are prohibited (r 4). They are also criminal offences (rr 8-18) and overseen by stringent enforcement mechanisms (rr 19-27). Sellers still have a defence of legitimate "puffery", or that their representations could not be taken seriously (e.g. "this washing powder makes your clothes whiter than white!").

Secondly, although it was not discussed in the case, there was evidence at the time that using the smoke ball actually made people more vulnerable to the flu (carbolic acid was put on the poisons register in 1900). The General Product Safety Regulations which are part of a European Union wide consumer protection regime (Directive 2001/95/EC) again provide criminal penalties for unsafe products.

Thirdly, the Consumer Protection Act 1987 (which is also part of EU wide regulation under Directive 85/374/EEC) creates a statutory tort of strict liability for defective products that cause any kind of personal injury or death, or damage over £100. This is the primary method for individuals to get compensation for any loss resulting from products. Similar regimes for product liability have developed around the world through statute and tort law since the early twentieth century, one of the leading cases being Donoghue v Stevenson.

Fourthly, under the Enterprise Act 2002, s 8, as in most developed countries, industry members form a trade associations. Businesses are expected to collectively regulate one another by drawing up Codes of Practice and have mechanisms for enforcement before tort or criminal law does.

Viewed with a modern eye, many have argued that Carlill should be seen as redolent of another era, not a foundational case in the law of contract. For instance, Professor Hugh Collins writes the following.

"The amusing circumstances of the case should not obscure the surprising extent to which the court was prepared to conceive social relations in terms of contracts. The parties to the alleged contract had never met or communicated with each other directly. Nor had they exchanged goods, money or services between themselves. The law of contract is used by the court as an instrument for discouraging misleading and extravagant claims in advertising and for deterring the marketing of unproven, and perhaps dangerous pharmaceuticals... The judges run through a shopping-list of questions: Was there a promise? Was the promise serious and intended to be acted upon? Was the promise sufficiently definite and certain? Was the promise accepted by the plaintiff? Did the plaintiff perform some action in exchange for the promise?... The generality and abstraction of the rules permit both the extensive utilization of [contract law] and its application to the case, without any discussion of such matters as the moral claims of the parties, the nature of the market for pharmaceuticals and the problems generated by misleading advertising... Its doctrinal integrity helps to achieve legitimacy, because the law can be presented as objective and neutral, not a matter of politics or preference, but a settled body of rules and principles, legitimated by tradition and routine observance, and applied impartially and fairly to all citizens."

Professor A. W. B. Simpson, in an article entitled 'Quackery and Contract Law' gave the background of the case as part of the scare arising from the Russian influenza pandemic of 1889-90. He points out that nobody knew what the flu actually was yet, nor how to prevent or cure it. After it was patented, the Carbolic Smoke Ball had in fact become rather popular in many esteemed circles including the Bishop of London who found it "has helped me greatly". The inventor, Frederick Roe, had advertised heavily when the epidemic hit London, which was getting extensive press coverage. But in the Pall Mall Gazette (just one instance where he put ads) there were many, many more quack remedies for misunderstood problems. Once the case had been decided by the Court of Appeal, it met with general approval, but especially so from the medical community. The Pharmaceutical Society of Great Britain had been fighting an ongoing battle against quack remedies, and had wanted specifically to get carbolic acid on the poisons register since 1882. Although without sympathy for the Carbolic Smoke Ball Company itself, Simpson casts doubt on whether Carlill was rightly decided.

"The analytical problems arose in a particularly acute form in the smoke ball case. Thus it seemed very peculiar to say that there had been any sort of agreement between Mrs. Carlill and the company, which did not even know of her existence until January 20, when her husband wrote to them to complain. There were indeed earlier cases permitting the recovery of advertised rewards; the leading case here was Williams v Carwardine, where a reward of £20 had been promised by a handbill for information leading to the conviction of the murderer of Walter Carwardine, and Williams, who gave such information, successfully sued to recover the reward. But this was long before the more modern doctrines had become so firmly embodied in legal thinking, and in any event the case was quite distinguishable. It concerned a reward, whereas Mrs. Carlill was seeking compensation. There could be at most only a few claimants for this, but there is no limit on the number of those who may catch influenza. Furthermore, the Carbolic Smoke Ball Company had had no chance to check the validity of claims, of which there could be an indefinite number; much was made of this point in the argument. But the judges were not impressed with these difficulties, and their attitude was no doubt influenced by the view that the defendants were rogues. They fit their decision into the structure of the law by boldly declaring that the performance of the conditions was the acceptance, thus fictitiously extending the concept of acceptance to cover the facts. And, since 1893, law students have been introduced to the mysteries of the unilateral contract through the vehicle of Carlill v Carbolic Smoke Ball Co. and taught to repeat, as a sort of magical incantation of contract law, that in the case of unilateral contracts performance of the act specified in the offer constitutes acceptance, and need not be communicated to the offeror."

In a much more recent American case from the Southern District of New York, Leonard v Pepsico, Inc, judge Kimba Wood wrote,

"Long a staple of law school curricula, Carbolic Smoke Ball owes its fame not merely to "the comic and slightly mysterious object involved" ... but also to its role in developing the law of unilateral offers."

Leonard had sued Pepsi to get a fighter jet which had featured in a TV ad. Supposedly one might get the jet if one had acquired loads of "Pepsi Points" from buying the soft drink. It was held that Leonard could not get the fighter jet, because the advertisement was not serious. Cashing in "Pepsi Points" could certainly mean various prizes, but the fighter jet thing was really a joke. Kimba Wood distinguished the case on a number of different grounds from Carlill, but it is clear that not all advertisements are always to be taken seriously. This leads back to the question of puffery.

Aftermath

After the action, Roe formed a new company with limited liability, and started up advertising again. Many people conclude after reading the case that the Carbolic Smoke Ball Company would have been brought down by thousands of claims. The company did not have limited liability, which could have meant personal ruin for Roe. In his submissions to the Court of Appeal, Finlay had used that as an argument against liability. He said that 10,000 people might now be sniffing at smoke balls hoping for their £100, and it would be a travesty to inflict insolvency on this one unfortunate company. But this did not happen at all. In a new advert on February 25, 1893 in the Illustrated London News, Roe cunningly turned the whole lost case to his advantage. He described the culpable advert, and then said,

"Many thousand Carbolic Smoke Balls were sold on these advertisements, but only three people claimed the reward of £100, thus proving conclusively that this invaluable remedy will prevent and cure the above mentioned diseases. The CARBOLIC SMOKE BALL COMPANY LTD. now offer £200 REWARD to the person who purchases a Carbolic Smoke Ball and afterwards contracts any of the following diseases..."

In the advertisement's small print were some restrictive conditions, with a period of 3 months to use the ball and claim, showing that legal advice had been adhered to. Roe left the management of the new company to other new subscribers and directors, who did not pursue such an aggressive advertising policy. By 1895 the company had fallen on harder times, and it had to be wound up in 1896. Simpson suggests that the new management "had failed to grasp the fact that vigorous advertising was essential to success in the field of quack medicine." Roe himself died at the age of 57 on June 3, 1899 of tuberculosis and valvular heart disease.

The unsuccessful defence counsel in the lower court, H. H. Asquith, went on to become Prime Minister of the United Kingdom.

Louisa Carlill, however, lived until she was 96. She died on March 10, 1942, according to her doctor, Joseph M. Yarman, principally of old age. But there was one other cause noted: influenza.

See also

English contract law
Invitation to treat

References

Footnotes

Bibliography
 For a critical and social analysis of the case and its place within 19th century free-market philosophy.
 For a basic discussion and analysis of the judgment.

Journal
 For a legal historian's discussion on the famous case.
Carlil v Carbolic Smoke Ball Company (1893) 1 QB 256.

External links

 Full text of the Court of Appeal decision on Bailii
 Full law report from Justis
 Carill v. Carbolic Smoke Ball Case Summary 

English agreement case law
English enforceability case law
English consideration case law
Lord Lindley cases
Court of Appeal (England and Wales) cases
1892 in British law
1892 in case law
The Pall Mall Gazette
Advertising in the United Kingdom
Advertising regulation